Borowo  is a village in the administrative district of Gmina Czempiń, within Kościan County, Greater Poland Voivodeship, in west-central Poland.

The village has a population of 580.

History
Borowo was a private village of Polish nobility, administratively located in the Kościan County in the Poznań Voivodeship in the Greater Poland Province of the Polish Crown. In the mid-19th century it was owned by the Mizerski family.

During the German occupation of Poland (World War II), the principal of the local primary school, Józef Wojciechowski, was murdered in a public execution of 18 Poles carried out in the nearby town of Kościan on October 23, 1939, by the Einsatzgruppe VI as part of the Intelligenzaktion. Inhabitants of Borowo were also among the victims of a massacre of 45 Poles carried out on November 7, 1939, in the forest near Kościan.

References

Villages in Kościan County